SeaWorld Adventure Parks Tycoon is a business simulation Windows game based on the SeaWorld parks that was released in 2003. It was published by Activision Value and developed by Deep Red Games. It had a sequel, SeaWorld Adventure Parks Tycoon 2, released in 2005 (2006 in Europe).

Overview

The game puts the player in the position of managing SeaWorld parks from a 2.5D (isometric) perspective. (The San Diego, San Antonio, and Orlando parks.) It features two different modes of play. One is a mode where the player must complete certain tasks in the park (often pre-built) before moving on. The second is a sandbox mode where the player starts building their own park out of the given barren land and a certain budget. In this mode, there are no limitations to what a player can and cannot do within the park grounds.

Reception
In the United States, SeaWorld Adventure Parks Tycoon sold 290,000 copies and earned $5.4 million by August 2006, after its release in September 2003. It was the country's 69th best-selling computer game between January 2000 and August 2006. Combined sales of all SeaWorld Adventure Parks Tycoon computer games released between January 2000 and August 2006 had reached 450,000 units in the United States by the latter date.

Sequel
SeaWorld Adventure Parks Tycoon 2 was released January 25, 2005.

References

2003 video games
Activision games
Amusement park simulation games
Business simulation games
DR Studios games
SeaWorld Parks & Entertainment
Single-player video games
Video games developed in the United Kingdom
Windows games
Windows-only games
Works based on amusement park attractions